Marryatville High School (MHS) is a public state secondary school in Adelaide, South Australia. The school is situated on a large area of land in the eastern suburb of Marryatville, part of the City of Norwood Payneham and St Peters. First Creek cuts through the school grounds and large gum trees line the property. The school was founded in 1976 during the Dunstan era, from the amalgamation of the Norwood Boys' Technical High School and the Kensington & Norwood Girls' High School.

History
Marryatville High School's roots go back to 1877, moving through several incarnations until its naming in 1976 as a co-educational high school:

Norwood Model School (1877–1942)
The Norwood Model School was opened on the east side of Osmond Terrace (between the Parade and Beulah Road) in response to the 1875 Act which provided for State funding of school buildings and compulsory education for children aged 7 to 13.  With the establishment of Norwood High School in 1910, it continued as a "Central School" until they were abolished in 1940, at which point it became a Junior Technical School.

Norwood Boys Junior Technical School (1942–1960)
The Junior Technical School continued to expand at the Osmond Terrace site, and in 1944 the Education Department bought 20 acres on Kensington Road at Marryatville. In 1947 Premier announced that classrooms and workshops would be built at Marryatville, and in 1950 tenders were called and work began. The workshops were opened in 1953. enrolments increased rapidly through the 1950s.

Norwood Boys Technical School (1961–1973)
Norwood Boys Technical School was officially opened in 1961 and the school continued to expand. In 1964 the school enrolment was 695 boys, 784 students attending night classes, and the Astronomical Observatory opened. enrolments peaked in the low 700s in the late 1960s, but by 1972 this had dropped to 316 and it was announced that the school would be converted to a comprehensive high school.

Marryatville Boys' High School (1974–1976)
The school was renamed in 1974 with an enrolment of 290. In 1975 it was announced that the school would amalgamate with the Kensington & Norwood Girls' High School.

Marryatville High School (1976–Present)
Marryatville High School, known colloquially by the school referring to itself and by others in reference to its sports teams, etc. as MHS, formed in 1976 with a focus on a special interest music program, which it maintains today. The first principal was Glen McArthur, who served in the position till 1991, by which time the school had a well-established reputation and enrolment.

Severe floods in November 2005 overflowed the banks of First Creek and caused some damage to the school.

Curriculum
Marryatville High School was accredited as an international school by the Council of International Schools in 2003 and formed a number of sister school relationships in France, Japan and China. The school specialises in particular subject areas, including music, drama, languages and tennis.

Music
One of the school's main focuses is music, as the school is one of four Specialist Interest Music Schools in South Australia. The Marryatville High School big bands have also won music competitions around the country, notably at Generations In Jazz several times over recent years. In 2007, the Concert Choir won the SA state final of the inaugural ABC Classic FM Choir of the Year Competition and second place in the national final, and won the Children's and Youth Choir section of the 10th International Choir Festival "Tallinn 2007" in Estonia.

The school provides two types of music education in the junior high school, known as Music I and Music II, also known as 'Elective Music' and 'Special Music'. The Music I program is less intense than Music II, with only 5 lessons of music a week while Music II  has 10 lessons. Music II is aimed at musicians with professional music potential, and includes lessons in Musical Development, Theory and Composition, Music Experience, Concert Practice and Choir.

Drama
The Performing Arts Centre, named "The Forge", is able to showcase drama, dance and musical performances. For the official opening of the school's theatre in 2005, a production by drama students was presented to guests including then South Australian Premier Mike Rann and state member for Norwood Vini Ciccarello. When talking to the cast and crew after the opening show, Mr Rann exclaimed, "I've never seen anything this good, at either a High School, University or TAFE". The drama department performs year level performances for students in year 10, 11 and 12, as well as putting on a Fringe performance in term 1, that for the first time in 2018, included a class of dancers, led by Ms K Cornish.

Languages
Marryatville High not only has an international student program, but has a large influence on languages for students. All students in year 8 do a language for the year, one of the three, Chinese, French or Japanese, and are then given the choice to continue languages later during their high school life. The language staff include 2 Japanese teachers, 2 Chinese teachers, and 4 French teachers.

Tennis
Marryatville High School also has a strong tennis program for students who are chosen by the school when they are in years 6 and 7. Each year level contains an average of 7 tennis students. These students study tennis as a subject, with theoretical study, as well as practice lessons during, before and after school. The tennis program is taught by accredited coaches, and includes participation in many state and national competitions.

Facilities
Eden Park, a grand two-storey Victorian house, is now used as the high school's Year 12 campus; the timber stables have been converted into a music centre. In 2005 Marryatville's Performing Arts Centre, The Forge, was opened. It serves as a performance area for year 11 and 12 Drama Productions and is also used by outside theatre groups. There is also a large gymnasium.

The school's most modern blocks are H Block and the Pines, the latter of which began operations in 2022 with the influx of Year 7 students, which the school was hosting for the first time. H Block is predominantly used for the sciences, having lab classrooms which include Bunsen burner gas valves, sinks, and other scientific equipment. 

The school has a very progressive agenda, being a 'discrimination-free zone', and is one of only a few schools in Adelaide with Unisex toilets. The school provides significant support to the LGBTQIA+ community, with activities during Pride Month and on Pride Day and consistent engagement and representation of the LGBTQIA+ in the school community.

Principals
1942 Cliff Rooney
1961 P B Hillbig
1964 R M Macpherson
1965 Norman Dowdy
1969 G B Payne
1975 Glen McArthur
1992 Kate Castine
2004 Mark Leahy
2018 John Tiver

Notable alumni
Imogen Annesley, film actress (Playing Beatie Bow) 
 Tilda Cobham-Hervey, actress (52 Tuesdays, Hotel Mumbai)
Sam Duluk, member of the South Australia Parliament for Waite
Callum Ferguson, Australian cricketer 
Michelle Lensink, South Australian politician
Brad McKenzie, Australian rules footballer, North Melbourne Football Club.
 George Oates, designer
 Marijana Rajcic, football player with Adelaide AFL club, ex-football player in Adelaide United FC 
Katrina Sedgwick, founding director of the Adelaide Film Festival, and director of the Australian Centre for the Moving Image
Michelle Tumes, contemporary Christian musician

Film location
The film Hey Hey It's Esther Blueburger (2008) included several scenes filmed at the school.

The TV Series First Day (TV series) (2020) was filmed predominately at the school.

References

External links 
Official school website
School iLearning Moodle Site

Public schools in South Australia
Schools of the performing arts in Australia
Special interest high schools in South Australia